Calhoun High School is a public high school in Hardin, Illinois that is part of the Calhoun Community Unit School District 40. Calhoun serves the communities of Hardin, Batchtown, Hamburg, Kampsville, Michael, and Mozier.

Athletics
The school has five state championships on record in team athletics and activities: football in 1992-1993 (1A) and 1993-1994 (1A), girls basketball in 2015-2016 (1A), and girls softball in 2015 (1A) and 2016 (1A.) They have also had three other state appearances: football state runner-up in 1986–1987, girls softball state fourth place in 2011, and girls basketball state runner-up in 2014–2015. Due to its small enrollment, Calhoun cooperates with nearby Brussels High School or Pleasant Hill High School for some athletics (Brussels for football, volleyball, basketball, softball and baseball. Pleasant Hill for track and field).

History

Calhoun High School was formed out of the consolidation of Hardin High School and other schools.

References

External links
 Calhoun High School
 Calhoun Community Unit School District 40 

Public high schools in Illinois
Schools in Calhoun County, Illinois